Implicit utilitarian voting is a voting system in which agents are assumed to have utilities for each alternative, but they express their preferences only by ranking the alternatives (like in ranked voting). The system tries to select an alternative which maximizes the sum of utilities, as in the utilitarian social choice rule, based only on the ranking information it has been provided. A possible advantage of implicit utilitarian voting over explicit utilitarian voting (where voters express their utilities directly) is that providing only a ranking may be cognitively easier for voters.

The main challenge of implicit utilitarian voting is that the rankings do not contain sufficient information to calculate exact utilities. For example, if Alice ranks option 1 above option 2, we do not know whether Alice's utility from option 1 is much higher than from option 2, or only slightly higher. So if Bob ranks option 2 above option 1, we cannot know which of the two options maximizes the sum of utilities. 

The (utilitarian) social welfare of an alternative is the sum of the utilities that agents assign to it (which are not known to the voting system). A voting rule that can only access the rankings cannot find the alternative that maximizes social welfare in all cases. Thus, implicit utilitarian voting aims to find an alternative whose social welfare is approximately optimal. The quality of the approximation a voting rule provides is usually measured by its so-called distortion: The distortion of a voting rule is the worst-case (over utility functions consistent with the reported profile of rankings) ratio between the maximum social welfare of any alternative and the social welfare of the alternative selected by the rule.

An alternative measure (less frequently studied) is the regret of a voting rule, which is the worst-case (over utility functions consistent with the reported profile of rankings) difference between the maximum social welfare and the social welfare of the alternative selected by the rule.

Some achievements in the theory of IUV are:

 Analyzing the distortion of various existing voting rules;
 Designing voting rules that minimize the distortion in single-winner elections and in multi-winner elections;
 Analyzing the distortion of various input formats for Preference elicitation in participatory budgeting.

Implementation 
Implicit utilitarian voting rules are used in the RoboVote website.

See also 

 Utilitarian cake-cutting - the utilitarian principle in a different context.

References 

Social choice theory
Preferential electoral systems
Cardinal electoral systems
Utilitarianism